Binhe District is a district of Baotou, the largest city of Inner Mongolia, People's Republic of China.

References 

County-level divisions of Inner Mongolia